Pedersoli is an Italian surname. Notable people with the surname include:

 Luca Pedersoli (born 1971), Italian rally driver
 Bud Spencer (born Carlo Pedersoli; 1929–2016), Italian actor, filmmaker and swimmer

See also
 Davide Pedersoli, Italian firearms manufacturing company

Italian-language surnames